Pagosa Springs Medical Center is a critical access hospital in Pagosa Springs, Colorado, in Archuleta County. The hospital has  11 beds.

It is a Level IV trauma center.

History
The medical center is a special district hospital serving all of Archuleta County and the parts of Hinsdale and Mineral counties that are south of the continental divide. The special district was formed in 1981, and the current hospital building opened in early 2008.

References

External links
Hospital website

Hospitals in Colorado
Buildings and structures in Archuleta County, Colorado
Hospitals established in 1981
1981 establishments in Colorado